Ulagampatti is a village located in S Pudur (Semmampatti Pudur) Panchayat Union of Singampunari Taluk in Sivagangai District, Tamil Nadu State, India.

Ulagampatti village has facilities including a bank, Lord Siva and Murugan Temple (Ulaganatha Swami Temple and Murugan Gnaniyar Madam) and elementary school.

The PIN code is 630410.

Temples in Ulagampatti include:
 Ulaganatha Swami Temple (one of the oldest temples)
 Gnaniyar Madam
 Aanginayar/Hanuman Kovil
 Nambaiyya Temple
 Pillaiyar Temple
 Ulagampatti Shirdi Sai Baba Temple
 Perumal Temple
 Kumariya Temple

It is also called the village of Nagarathars due to the majority Nagarathar population.

Economy
The main economic activity in Ulagampatti is agriculture. There is not much industrial activity in the village. There is a small-scale rice milling factory located near the post office. Road facilities of Ulagampatti are connected to the national highways for ease of access.

Transportation
Ulagampatti is well connected by roadways.  The Tamil Nadu State Transport Corporation (TNSTC) and private companies operate frequent bus services between Ulagampatti and Ponnamaravathi, Thuvarankurichi, Singampunari, Kottampatti Tiruchirappalli, Madurai, Dindigul, Coimbatore and Rameswaram.

Facilities
 Ulagampatti Police Station 
 Ponnamaravathi nearest Fire Station
 Ulagampatti Indian Bank with ATM, Immediate Payment Service facility and Western Union Money Transfer
 Ulagampatti Post Office  (with Speed Post)
 Government Village Office (VO)
 Ulagampatti Government Higher Secondary School
 Ulagampatti Village Library

Telecommunications network
Currently 4G LTE Services works at a acceptable level from the service providers like JIO, Airtel India, Vodafone India and 2G, 3G services from BSNL.  Landline telephone using PSTN and FAX services are provided by BSNL.  Indian Bank office and its ATM at the Ulagampatti office uses satellite internet.

Cable & satellite television
Digital Cable TV services are provided currently using CoAxial cables in the village.  Direct to home satellite television is also used for receiving both government and private run TV channels.

Ulagampatti postal services
Ulagampatti is a sub-post office (S.O) of the India Post and supports the following neighbouring branch (B.O) post offices:

 Ulagampatti S.O & Padaminchi
 Kattukudipatti B.O
 Kilavayal B.O
 Mandakudipatti B.O
 Neduvayal B.O
 Tiruvalandur B.O
 V. Pudur B.O
 Varapur B.O.

The PIN code is 630410.

About Nagarathars
Nagarathar business people are Hindus, predominantly originating in the Chettinad region of Tamil Nadu. They have been trading with Southeast Asia since the heyday of the Chola empire, but in the 19th century they migrated to countries throughout Southeast Asia. (See Tamil diaspora)

Nagarathars, (also known as Chettiars), were an important trading class of 19th- and 20th-century Southeast Asia and spread to Sri Lanka, Myanmar, Malaysia, Singapore, Java, Sumatra, and Ho Chi Minh City. Changing political and economic situations since that time have caused many of these communities to disappear as their members returned to India or sought other, more hospitable homes.

Chettiars were traditionally involved in occupations like moneylending and wholesale trading. Banks established by Chettiars include the now-defunct Bank of Chettinad, and the now ICICI-merged Bank of Madura founded by Karumuttu Thiagarajan Chettiar (an architect par excellence, textile don, highly principled educationist and philanthropist), Indian Overseas Bank founded by Shri. M. Ct. M. Chidambaram Chettiar, and Indian Bank founded by Raja Annamalai Chettiar. Nagarathars are known for their philanthropy, building temples and schools and maintaining them throughout Asia.

References

See also
Ponnamaravathi
S Pudur block
Piranmalai
Singampunari Taluk
Tiruppathur

Villages in Sivaganga district

ta:உலகம்பட்டி ஊராட்சி